The Political History of Islam is the name of a two-volume book written by Rasul Jafarian, the first volume of which is entitled "The life conduct of the Prophet (of Islam)" in 692 pages and the second volume is entitled "History of the Caliphs" in 828 pages. The book has been translated into English, Arabic and Urdu.

Introduction
The author Rasul Jafarian states in a part of the introduction of this collection:

Structure
In the first volume of this two-volume book, which has been published with an analytical approach, called "The life conduct of the Prophet (of Islam)", examines the political history of Islam from life to the death of Mohammad Ibn Abdullah. But in the second volume called "History of the caliphs from the death of the messenger(s) to the decline of the umayyad", in addition to reviewing events, biography, and the origins of the first caliphs and the history of evolution of the two dynasties of the Umayyad and Abbasid, the life of Shiite Imams has also been discussed.

The life conduct of the Prophet (of Islam)
This volume is written in 7 chapters that they are:

 Chapter One: Muslims historiography
 Chapter Two: Jahiliyyah period
 The political and social situation of Arabs of Arabian Peninsula
 Religion and religiosity of people during Jahiliyyah period
 Culture and science in Jahiliyyah period
 Chapter Three: The Beginning of Islam
 Chapter Four: Islam against the pressure of Quraysh
 Chapter Five: Islam in Medina (In this chapter, the analysis of the causes of rapid expansion of Islam in Medina has been discussed)
 Chapter Six: Wars of Prophet (of Islam) until the fifth year of his emigration (Battle of Badr, Battle of Uhud, Battle of the Trench, Banu Qurayza and war with tribes)
 Chapter Seven: To win over the Hejaz (In this chapter Treaty of Hudaybiyyah, Battle of Khaybar, Conquest of Mecca and... to the death of Mohammad Ibn Abdullah has been discussed)

History of the Caliphs
This volume is compiled in 12 main sections that they are:

 Section One: Abu Bakr's Caliphate
 Section Two: Omar's Caliphate
 Section Three: Uthman's Caliphate
 Section Four: Ali's Imamate
 Section Five: Hasan ibn Ali's Imamate
 Section Six: Muawiyah's Kingdom
 Section Seven: Battle of Karbala and its Consequences
 Section Eight: Transfer of Caliphate from Sufyanids to Marwanids
 Section Nine: Imam Sajjad
 Section Ten: The government of the Marwanids
 Section Eleven: Shiites in the last decades of the Umayyad government
 Section Twelve: the Marwanids government facing the decline

Critique and review
This two-volume book, in addition to the subject of several interviews and reports, has been criticized.

See also
 Atlas of Shia
 The specialized library on Islam and Iran
 Bibliography of Rasul Jafarian
 History of Islamic Iran
 The intellectual and political life of Shia Imams
 Reflection on the Ashura movement
 Rijal al-Kashshi

References

External links
 History of the caliphs on Adineh
 History of The Caliphs on GHbook
 History of the Caliphs (Hardcover) on Amazon
 History of The Caliphs (Paperback) on Amazon
 History of The Caliphs on al-Islam
 Rasul Jafarian - Google Scholar
 Rasul Jafarian articles in English on SID
 Rasul Jafarian English articles on Magiran

Rasul Jafarian's books
Shia bibliography